Joseph Marie Florent Henri Sénat (born 13 March 1865, date of death unknown) was a French épée and foil fencer. He competed at the 1900 and 1906 Summer Olympics.

References

External links
 

1865 births
Year of death missing
French male épée fencers
Olympic fencers of France
Fencers at the 1900 Summer Olympics
Fencers at the 1906 Intercalated Games
French male foil fencers
Sportspeople from Toulouse
Place of death missing